Maghrebi Unity Stadium is a multi-use stadium in Béjaïa, Algeria.  It is currently used mostly for football matches and is the home ground of JSM Béjaïa and MO Béjaïa. The stadium holds 18,000 people.

Algeria national football team matches

The Stade de l'Unité Maghrébine has hosted one game of the Algeria national football team, against Morocco in 1989.

References

External links
 Stadium file - goalzz.com

Football venues in Algeria
Buildings and structures in Béjaïa Province
JSM Béjaïa